Việt Trì Stadium is an association football stadium located in Việt Trì city, Phú Thọ province, Vietnam. This stadium with a capacity of nearly 18,000 seats is located in the premises of the Sports Complex of Phú Thọ province. Currently, the stadium is the home ground of Phú Thọ Football Club.

History 
Việt Trì Stadium has existed since the 1960s. In 2005, it was invested and built by the People's Committee of Phú Thọ province with an investment of about 100 billion VND. Due to many years without a major tournament, many items of the yard have deteriorated. However, in recent years, the sport movement has received the attention of the Provincial Party Committee and the People's Committee of Phú Thọ province, especially strongly investing in football. In April 2019, the province focused resources on repairing and upgrading Việt Trì Stadium's facilities and a number of other necessary sports items and institutions, serving the sports needs of the people and host domestic and international football matches. After being renovated, the stadium hosted an international friendly match between Vietnam U23 and Myanmar U23 on June 7, 2019; It is also the venue for the matches of Phú Thọ Football Club in Vietnamese League Three 2019, Vietnamese League Two 2020.

Việt Trì Stadium will host Group A in men's football at the 2021 Southeast Asian Games.

References

Football venues in Vietnam